Agazio di Somma (1591 – 1 October 1671) was a Roman Catholic prelate and baroque writer who served as Bishop of Catanzaro (1664–1671)
and Bishop of Cariati e Cerenzia (1659–1664).

Biography
Agazio di Somma was born in Simeri, Italy in 1591.
On 13 January 1659, he was appointed during the papacy of Pope Alexander VII as Bishop of Cariati e Cerenzia.
On 26 January 1659, he was consecrated bishop by Marcantonio Franciotti, Cardinal-Priest of Santa Maria della Pace.
On 28 April 1664, he was appointed during the papacy of Pope Alexander VII as Bishop of Catanzaro.

He published a chronicle of earthquakes in Calabria during 1638-1641, titled Istorico racconto de' terremoti della Calabria dal 1638 al 1641 (Naples) and an Italian life of saint Pius V, translated into French by André Félibien in 1672. In a discourse before the Accademia degli Umoristi, Agazio di Somma proclaimed that Giambattista Marino's Adone surpassed its model, Torquato Tasso's Jerusalem Delivered. Ironically, two of Marino's staunchest disciples, Girolamo Preti and Antonio Bruni, were the first to denounce the possibility that the Adone might rank superior to the Gerusalemme. The episode annoyed Marino and embittered him against his friends.

He served as Bishop of Catanzaro until his death on 1 October 1671.

Works 
 Agazio di Somma, I due primi canti dell'America, Poema heroico, Rome: Bartolomeo Zannetti, 1624.
 
 Agazio di Somma, L'arte del viver felice, ovvero Le tre giornate di oro. Messina : Giacomo Mattei, 1649 (2nd edit. Naples: Gio. Alberto Tarini, 1654).
 Agazio di Somma, La vie du pape Pie V, translated by André Félibien; Paris : J.B. Coignard, 1672 (on-line).
 Agazio di Somma, Dell'origine dell'anno santo. Pietro De Leo (ed.). Collana Biblioteca di storia e cultura meridionale. Soveria Mannelli: Rubbettino Editore, 2000, ISBN 8849800568.

References

External links and additional sources
 
 (for Chronology of Bishops) 
 (for Chronology of Bishops) 
 (for Chronology of Bishops) 
 (for Chronology of Bishops) 

17th-century Italian Roman Catholic bishops
Bishops appointed by Pope Alexander VII
1591 births
1671 deaths